René A. Messa was a college football player. He was a prominent running back for the LSU Tigers of Louisiana State University, selected All-Southern in 1904. He later played for the University of Havana, which played LSU in the Bacardi Bowl in 1907. He also punted.

References

American football fullbacks
LSU Tigers football players
Cuban sportspeople
All-Southern college football players
People from Santiago de Cuba
American football punters
American football halfbacks